Dorothy Helen Ruth Pirone (June 7, 1921 – May 18, 1989) was the biological daughter of the US baseball player Babe Ruth and his mistress Juanita Jennings (born Juanita Grenandtz). She was adopted by Babe and his first wife Helen Woodford Ruth of Boston Massachusetts. She wrote a memoir of her father, titled My Dad, the Babe.

Childhood
Dorothy was born June 7, 1921 in New York City at St. Vincent's Hospital to Juanita Jennings, and was adopted by Babe and Helen Woodford. It is documented that Dorothy was raised to believe that Helen was her biological mother. It is speculated that Helen did not know that Dorothy was the result of an extramarital affair between Babe and his girlfriend Jennings. It is possible that when Babe Ruth learned of his mistress' pregnancy, he convinced Helen, unaware that Babe was the father, to adopt the baby girl. Babe Ruth also somehow convinced Dorothy's biological mother to allow him to adopt their daughter, so that she could be raised with him and (a possibly unsuspecting) Helen.

Helen and Babe Ruth separated some time between 1924 and 1926. Babe and Helen Ruth did not divorce because of their religious beliefs. Dorothy lived with her adoptive mother Helen after the separation. In January 1929, when she was 7 years old, her mother died in a house fire. After Helen's death, Dorothy lived with her father and Claire Merritt Ruth, whom he married in April 1929. She had one step-sister as Babe had adopted Claire's daughter Julia.

Dorothy learned at the age of 59 in 1980 that Juanita Jennings Ellias was her biological mother. Dorothy had known Juanita growing up, but only as a friend of her father. She referred to Jennings as Aunt Nita.

Later life
She married Daniel J. Sullivan, a Brooklyn employee of the Railway Express Agency, on January 7, 1940. Her son, Daniel J. Sullivan Jr. (1940 - 1974), was born in October 1940 and later had five children. Dorothy's marriage to Sullivan also produced two daughters, Genevieve Herrlein and Ellen Ruth Hourigan (1943-2017), before the union ended in 1945. Dorothy later married Dominick Pirone in New York City on December 8, 1948. Three children were born of this second marriage: Donna Analovitch, Richard Pirone (1950-2001), and Linda Ruth Tosetti (b. 1954). She lived in Durham, Connecticut, raised Arabian horses, and wrote My Dad, the Babe.

She was a joint plaintiff along with the Babe Ruth League in a trademark dispute with Macmillan Incorporated over use of the Babe Ruth likeness.

She died on May 18, 1989 at the age of 67 in Durham, Connecticut, survived by four daughters, a son and 12 grandchildren.

References 

1921 births
1989 deaths
Babe Ruth
20th-century American biographers
American women biographers
American adoptees